USS E-2 (SS-25) was an E-class submarine of the United States Navy. Originally named Sturgeon, the boat was launched on 15 June 1911 by the Fore River Shipyard, Quincy, Massachusetts; sponsored by Ms. Margaret Nelson Little; renamed E-2 on 17 November 1911; and commissioned on 14 February 1912d.

Service history
Serving in the Atlantic Submarine Flotilla, E-2 sailed out of Newport, Rhode Island for developmental exercises and training. From 5 January-21 April 1914, she cruised to Guantanamo Bay and the Gulf of Mexico. She returned to Naval Station Newport on 27 July, for training operations for the remainder of the summer and from February–May 1915 off Florida.

On 19 June, she entered New York Navy Yard for overhaul. While sitting in dry dock Number 2,
 E-2 was victim of a violent explosion and fire on 15 January 1916 when hydrogen gas ignited during conditions of severe battery testing; tests made under the direction of the Edison Storage Battery Company. At the time, E-2 was the test submarine for new nickel battery designed to eliminate the danger from chlorine gas asphyxiation. There were 32 men aboard the submarine at the time of the explosion, consisting of both crew and civilian electricians and mechanics making repairs. Four men were killed and seven injured. The government investigation, led by then Lieutenant Chester W. Nimitz, pointed blame away from the submarine's commanding officer, then Lieutenant Charles M. Cooke, Jr.

On 13 March, E-2 was placed out of commission for use as a laboratory, for exhaustive tests of the Edison storage battery. Recommissioned on 25 March 1918, E-2 served in training and experimental work at New London until 16 May. Two days later she arrived at Norfolk to operate against enemy submarines off Cape Hatteras. From 21 May-27 August, she made four war patrols, sighting a large enemy submarine for which she made extended submerged search on her last patrol. E-2 was commended by the Chief of Naval Operations for two of these anti-submarine patrols, which were exceptionally long for a submarine of her size.

Returning to New London on 31 August 1918, E-2 made two more patrols before the end of the war, then returned to training student officers and qualifying men for duty in submarines. She sailed from New London to Norfolk on 19 April 1920, arriving two days later. There she was placed in commission in ordinary on 18 July 1921. On 17 September, she sailed for Philadelphia Navy Yard where she was decommissioned on 20 October and sold on 19 April 1922.

References

External links
 
 Video of the U.S.S. E-2 Underway

United States E-class submarines
World War I submarines of the United States
Ships built in Quincy, Massachusetts
1911 ships
Maritime incidents in 1916